The following is a list of current commercial operators of the Airbus A220.

Summary

, there were 251 A220 family aircraft in commercial service with 16, including 1 undisclosed operators.
The five largest A220 operators are Delta Air Lines (60), airBaltic (39), Air Canada (33), Swiss International Air Lines (30) and Air France (18).

Current operators

Former operators
Air Sinai operated two A220-300s of EgyptAir between December 2019 and May 2021, and then begun flying for Nigeria's Ibom Air.

Future operators
Starting in late 2023, Qantas will start taking deliveries of their red-tailed Airbus A220-300s to replace Qantas' domestic fleet of ageing Boeing 717s. The 20 planes on order will form the backbone of their domestic fleet along with the Airbus A321-XLR.

See also
 List of Embraer E-Jet operators

Notes

References

Airbus A220
Airbus A220
Airbus A220